Bjørn Cook (11 April 1917 – 30 September 2003) was a Norwegian wrestler. He was born in Trondheim, and represented the club IF Ørnulf. He competed at the 1948 Summer Olympics in London.

References

External links 
 

1917 births
2003 deaths
Sportspeople from Trondheim
Olympic wrestlers of Norway
Wrestlers at the 1948 Summer Olympics
Norwegian male sport wrestlers